The 2022 Star Nursery 150 was the 10th stock car race of the 2022 ARCA Menards Series West season, and the 5th iteration of the event. The race is scheduled to be held on Friday, October 14, 2022, in North Las Vegas, Nevada at the Las Vegas Motor Speedway Bullring, a 0.375 mile (0.604 km) permanent oval shaped racetrack. The race was increased from 150 laps to 158 laps, due to a green-white-checker finish. Taylor Gray, driving for David Gilliland Racing, would be unstoppable throughout the entire race, leading all but one lap for his fifth career ARCA Menards Series West win, and his second of the season. To fill out the podium, Andrés Peréz de Lara, driving for David Gilliland Racing, and Landen Lewis, driving for Bill McAnally Racing, would finish 2nd and 3rd, respectively. 

This race also made history, as Sarah and Bridget Burgess become the first mother-daughter duo to race against each other in a NASCAR and ARCA event. Sarah drove a second car for her team, the 97, with sponsorship coming from eBay Motors. 

This was also the 100th ARCA West Series start for Takuma Koga.

Background 
Las Vegas Motor Speedway, located in Clark County, Nevada in Las Vegas, Nevada about 15 miles northeast of the Las Vegas Strip, is a  complex of multiple tracks for motorsports racing. The complex is owned by Speedway Motorsports, Inc., which is headquartered in Charlotte, North Carolina.

Entry list 

 (R) denotes rookie driver

Practice/Qualifying 

Practice and qualifying were both combined into one 90-minute session, with a driver's fastest time counting as their qualifying lap. The session was held on Friday, October 14, at 2:15 PM PST.

Race results

References

External links 

2022 ARCA Menards Series West
Star Nursery 150
Star Nursery 150